The yellow-bellied warbler (Abroscopus superciliaris) is a species of bush warbler (family Cettiidae). It was formerly included in the "Old World warbler" assemblage.

It is found in Bangladesh, Bhutan, Brunei, Cambodia, China, India, Indonesia, Laos, Malaysia, Myanmar, Nepal, Thailand, and Vietnam. Its natural habitats are temperate forest, subtropical or tropical moist lowland forest, and subtropical or tropical moist montane forest.

References

yellow-bellied warbler
Birds of Bhutan
Birds of Southeast Asia
Birds of Northeast India
Birds of Yunnan
yellow-bellied warbler
yellow-bellied warbler
Taxonomy articles created by Polbot